Cancer and Delirium is J. Tillman's fifth album, released via the Yer Bird label. The cover photo was taken by Dominique Jaquin.

Morgan King, the former owner of Yer Bird, wrote, that "on Cancer and Delirium Tillman strikes the perfect balance between the intimacy of his earlier releases [...] with the masterful, nuanced melodic sense of his excellent 2006 Fargo release, Minor Works. The songs are imbued with the same strikingly disconsolate singing and devastatingly poignant prose that J. Tillman is known for and accented with gorgeous, spare arrangements."

In an interview for SCTAS, Tillman said: "Most of the songs were written during a week off alone in Paris, and the album title came from a line in Tropic Of Cancer, which essentially is about being young and poor and isolated in Paris, so it all came together. That phrase just kept running through my head. That record is also my first time experimenting with some alternate tunings, which I think contributes to the "prettiness" of it."

Track listing

References

External links
J. Tillman official website
Yer Bird Records
Cancer And Delirium at Yer Bird

2007 albums
Yer Bird Records albums
Josh Tillman albums